Please add names of notable painters with a Wikipedia page, in precise English alphabetical order, using U.S. spelling conventions. Country and regional names refer to where painters worked for long periods, not to personal allegiances.

László Paál (1846–1879), Hungarian painter 
Stephen Pace (1918–2010), American artist
T. K. Padmini (1940–1969), Indian painter
Grace Pailthorpe (1883–1971), English surrealist painter
Anthonie Palamedesz. (1601–1673), Dutch painter
Maties Palau Ferré (1921–2000), Spanish (Catalonian) painter, draftsman and ceramicist
Béla Pállik (1845–1908), Hungarian painter and opera singer
Kalervo Palsa (1947–1987), Finnish artist
Tom Palin (born 1974), English painter
Pamphilus (4th century BC), Ancient Greek painter
Arthur Pan (fl. 1920–1960), Hungarian/English portrait painter
Pan Tianshou (潘天壽, 1897–1971), Chinese painter and educator
Pan Yuliang (潘玉良, 1899–1977), Chinese painter
Giovanni Paolo Pannini (1691–1765), Italian painter and architect
Józef Pankiewicz (1866–1940), Polish/French painter, graphic artist and teacher
Eduardo Paolozzi (1924–2005), Scottish artist and sculptor
George Papazov (1894–1972), Bulgarian/French painter and writer
Roberto Parada (born 1969), American painter
David Park (1911–1960), American painter
Constance-Anne Parker (1921–2016), English painter and sculptor
John Parker (1798–1860), Welsh artist and cleric
Lawton S. Parker (1868–1954), American painter
Ray Parker (1922–1990), American painter
Parmigianino (1504–1540), Italian painter and print-maker
Antônio Parreiras (1860–1937), Brazilian painter, designer and illustrator
Clara Weaver Parrish (1861–1925), American painter and stained-glass designer
Maxfield Parrish (1870–1966), American painter and illustrator
Ulrika Pasch (1735–1796), Swedish painter and miniaturist
Ed Paschke (1939–2004), American painter
Jules Pascin (1885–1930), Bulgarian/American painter and draftsman
Odhise Paskali (1903–1985), Albanian sculptor
George Passantino (1922–2004), American artist, teacher and author
Leonid Pasternak (1862–1945), Russian/Soviet painter
Jean-Baptiste Pater (1695–1736), French painter
Emily Murray Paterson (1855–1934), Scottish painter
James Paterson (1854–1932), Scottish painter
Viola Paterson (1899–1981), Scottish/English painter, engraver and woodcut artist
Joachim Patinir (1480–1524), Flemish painter
Károly Patkó (1895–1941), Hungarian painter and copper engraver
David Paton (fl. 1660–1700), Scottish miniature painter
Joseph Noel Paton (1821–1901), Scottish artist, illustrator and sculptor
James McIntosh Patrick (1907–1998), Scottish painter
Ambrose McCarthy Patterson (1877–1967), Australian/American painter and print-maker
Gen Paul (1898–1975), French painter and engraver
William McGregor Paxton (1869–1941), American painter and instructor
Michael Gustavius Payne (born 1969), Welsh painter
Charles Willson Peale (1741–1827), American painter, soldier and naturalist
James Peale (1749–1831), American painter
Raphaelle Peale (1774–1825), American still-life painter
Rembrandt Peale (1778–1860), American artist and museum founder
Rubens Peale (1784–1865), American artist and museum curator
Titian Peale (1799–1885), American artist, naturalist and explorer
Max Pechstein (1881–1955), German painter and print-maker
Carl-Henning Pedersen (1913–2007), Danish painter
Pedro Pedraja (born 1974), Spanish/English painter
Olivia Peguero (born 1963), Dominican painter and botanic artist
Lucia Peka (1912–1991), Latvian/American artist
Waldo Peirce (1884–1970), American painter
Slobodan Pejić (1944–2006), Yugoslav (Bosnian)/Slovenian sculptor and painter
Amelia Peláez (1896–1968), Cuban painter
Fernand Pelez (1843–1913), French painter
Gina Pellón (born 1926), Cuban/French painter
Agnes Lawrence Pelton (1881–1961), American painter 
Sophie Pemberton (1869–1959), Canadian painter
Giovanni Pelliccioli (born 1947), Italian painter
Relja Penezic (born 1950), Yugoslav (Serbian)/American painter, print-maker and film-maker
Vincent Pepi (born 1926), American painter
Samuel Peploe (1871–1935), Scottish painter
Matteo Pérez (c. 1547 – c. 1616), Italian painter
Christopher Perkins (1891–1968), English/New Zealand painter and teacher
Constant Permeke (1886–1952), Belgian painter and sculptor
Vasily Perov (1833–1882), Russian painter
Lilla Cabot Perry (1848–1933), American artist
Pietro Perugino (c. 1445 – 1523), Italian painter
Robert Storm Petersen (1882–1949), Danish cartoonist, illustrator and painter
Jean Petitot (1607–1691), Swiss/French enamel painter
Jean Louis Petitot (1652–1730), French enamel painter
Roy Petley (born 1951), English painter
John F. Peto (1854–1907), American painter
Soma Orlai Petrich (1822–1880), Hungarian painter
Giuseppe Antonio Petrini (1677–1755), Swiss painter
John Pettie (1839–1893), Scottish/English painter
Valerie Petts (living), English painter
Peter S. Pezzati (1902–1993), American painter
Erik Pevernagie (born 1939), Belgian painter and writer
Theodor Philipsen (1840–1920), Danish painter and figure-maker
Ammi Phillips (1788–1865), American painter
L. Vance Phillips (1858 – pre-1951), American china painter
Tom Phillips (born 1937), English painter, print-maker and collagist
Ramón Piaguaje (born 1962), Ecuadorian painter and environmentalist
Giovanni Battista Piazzetta (1682–1754), Italian painter
Francis Picabia (1879–1953), French painter, poet and typographer
Pablo Picasso (1881–1973), Spanish/French painter, sculptor and ceramicist
Ramon Pichot (1872–1925), Spanish (Catalan) painter
Nicolaes Eliaszoon Pickenoy (1588–1655), Dutch painter
Joseph Pickett (1848–1918), American painter
Otto Piene (1928–2014), German/American artist
Patrick Pietropoli (born 1953), French painter and sculptor
André Pijet (living), Polish/French cartoonist
Adam Pijnacker (1622–1673), Dutch painter
Otto Pilny (1866–1936), Swiss painter
Carl Gustaf Pilo (1711–1793), Swedish/Danish artist and academy director
Veno Pilon (1896–1970), Yugoslav/Slovenian painter, graphic artist and photographer
Robert Antoine Pinchon (1886–1943), French painter
Howardena Pindell (born 1943), American painter and mixed-media artist
Xavier Blum Pinto (born 1957), Ecuadorian artist
Grytė Pintukaitė (born 1977), Soviet/Lithuanian painter
Pinturicchio (c. 1454 – 1513), Italian painter
Richard Pionk (1936–2007), American painter
George Pirie (1863–1946), Scottish painter and draftsman
Pisanello (c. 1395 – 1455), Italian painter
Joseph Pisani (born 1971), American painter and photographer
Camille Pissarro (1830–1903), Danish/French painter
Lucien Pissarro (1863–1944), English painter and etcher
Orovida Camille Pissarro (1893–1968), English painter and etcher
Primrose Pitman (1902–1998), English painter and draftsman
Lari Pittman (born 1952), American painter
Giambattista Pittoni (1687–1767) Italian painter and academician
Antoni Pitxot (born 1934) Spanish (Catalan) painter
Otto Placht (born 1962) Czechoslovak/Peruvian painter
Josefina Tanganelli Plana (1904–1968), Spanish (Catalan) cartoonist and painter
John Platt (1886–1967), English painter
John Plumb (1927–2008), English painter
Władysław Podkowiński (1866–1895), Polish painter and illustrator
Ihor Podolchak (born 1962), Soviet/Ukrainian film-maker and visual artist
Egbert van der Poel (1621–1664), Dutch painter
Cornelis van Poelenburgh (1594–1667), Dutch painter and draftsman
Louis Pohl (1915–1999), American painter, illustrator and art teacher
Vasily Polenov (1844–1927), Russian painter
Serge Poliakoff (1900–1969), Russian/French painter
Sigmar Polke (1941–2010), German painter and photographer
Jackson Pollock (1912–1956), American painter
Elizabeth Polunin (1887–1950), English artist and theater designer
Fay Pomerance (1912–2001), English painter
Jacopo Pontormo (1494–1557), Italian painter
Horatio Nelson Poole (1884–1949), American painter, print-maker and teacher
Willem de Poorter (1608–1648), Dutch painter
Liubov Popova (1889–1924), Russian painter and designer
Bertalan Pór (1880–1964), Hungarian painter
Fairfield Porter (1907–1975), American painter and art critic
Candido Portinari (1903–1962), Brazilian painter
Marten Post (born 1942), Dutch visual artist
Hendrik Gerritsz Pot (1580–1657), Dutch painter
Beatrix Potter (1866–1943), English children's author and illustrator
Paulus Potter (1625–1654), Dutch painter
Fuller Potter (1910–1990), American artist
Edward Henry Potthast (1857–1927), American painter
William Didier-Pouget (1864–1959), French painter
Nathaniel Pousette-Dart (1886–1965), American painter and art writer
Richard Pousette-Dart (1916–1992), American painter, sculptor and photographer
Nicolas Poussin (1594–1665), French/Italian painter
William Powhida (born 1976), American visual artist and art critic
Domenico Pozzi (1745–1796), Italian painter
Andrea Pozzo (1642–1709), Italian painter, architect and Jesuit
Harvey Pratt (born 1941), American forensic artist
Fred A. Precht (1863–1942), American painter
Maurice Prendergast (1861–1924), American artist
Peter Prendergast (1946–2007), Welsh landscape painter
Gregorio Prestopino (1907–1984), American artist
Gaetano Previati (1852–1920), Italian painter
Mary Elizabeth Price (1877–1965), American painter
Gwilym Prichard (1931–2015), Welsh painter
Alice Prin (1901–1953), French painter, model and actress
John Quinton Pringle (1864–1925), Scottish painter
Dod Procter (1890–1972), English painter
Ernest Procter (1885–1935), English painter, designer and illustrator
František Jakub Prokyš (1713–1791), Austro-Hungarian (Bohemian) painter
Andrzej Pronaszko (1888–1961), Polish painter and scenographer
Samuel Prout (1783–1852), English watercolor painter
John Skinner Prout (1805–1876), English/Australian painter, lithographer and art teacher
Tadeusz Pruszkówski (1888–1942), Polish painter and art teacher
Witold Pruszkówski (1846–1896), Polish painter and graphic artist
Illarion Pryanishnikov (1840–1894), Russian painter
Pu Hua (蒲華, 1834–1911), Chinese painter and calligrapher
Louisa Puller (1884–1963), English painter and wartime artist
Puru (溥儒, 1896–1963), Chinese painter and calligrapher
Fritz Puempin (1901–1972), Swiss painter and archaeologist
Johann Pucher (1814–1864), Austro-Hungarian (Slovenian) artist, poet and priest 
Karl Pümpin (1907–1975), Swiss painter
Hovsep Pushman (1877–1966), Armenian/American painter
Sasha Putrya (1977–1989), Soviet (Ukrainian) child artist
Patrick Pye (1929–2018), Irish sculptor, painter and stained-glass artist
Jacob Pynas (1592–1650), Dutch painter
Jan Pynas (1583–1667), Dutch painter

References
References can be found under each entry.

P